Giorgos Kefalidis (born 21 March 1941) is a Greek former professional footballer who played as defender. His nickname was "Ruby" as of Jack Ruby, the killer of Lee Harvey Oswald who was the assassin of John F. Kennedy.

Club career
Kefalidis started his career in his hometown club, at Mega Alexandros Katerinis, before merging with Olympos Katerinis in 1961, and create what would eventually become the big team of the city, Pierikos, competing in the second division. Making excellent performances with the club of Katerini, he helped them get the promotion to the first division in 1962 and he also became an international. In the summer of 1964 he aroused the interest of the Greek giant, AEK Athens. He took the big step in his career at the age of 23 and became a key member of the team, helping mainly at the right end of the defense, but also as a central defender. On 2 July 1965 he scored the only goal of his team in the 3–1 defeat against Olympiacos at Karaiskakis Stadium, for the quarter-final of the Cup and thus they were left out of the continuation of the institution. A key member of the team that won second place in the Balkans Cup in 1967, losing only in the final by Fenerbahçe. He was also one of the main players in the squad that reached the quarter-finals of the European Cup in 1969. He remained at AEK for almost a decade, winning with the team 2 Championships and a Cup in 1966. In the summer of 1972, as a part of the renewal of the club's roster by the then manager Branko Stanković, he was transferred with other players of AEK, to Atromitos, which played until the end of his career in 1974.

International career
Kefalidis made 2 appearances with Greece in 1963. On 14 April 1963, he played at a friendly match was held in Lisbon for Greece U21 against Portugal, but it proved to be a men's team, as players of 25 and 26 years old were competing. He made his official debut alongside his future teammate at AEK, Mimis Papaioannou who played as the captain of Greece, on 27 November 1963 in a friendly away 3–1 loss against Cyprus, under his also future manager at AEK, Tryfon Tzanetis.

Personal life
Kefalidis is an active member of the Veterans Association of AEK Athens. In the early 1990's he also worked, as a stuff  member of Greece U21.

He was married to Anna, until her death in July 2020. The have two children named Rika and Dimitris.

Honours

Pierikos
Beta Ethniki: 1961–62 (Group C)

AEK Athens
Alpha Ethniki: 1967–68, 1970–71
Greek Cup: 1965–66

References

1941 births
Living people
Greek footballers
Greece international footballers
Super League Greece players
Association football defenders
Pierikos F.C. players
AEK Athens F.C. players
Atromitos F.C. players
Footballers from Katerini